The index of physics articles is split into multiple pages due to its size.

To navigate by individual letter use the table of contents below.

U

U-duality
U.S. Standard Atmosphere
UA1 experiment
UA2 experiment
UC Santa Barbara Physics Department
UK Dark Matter Collaboration
UMER
UMIST linear system
UNIT OF REFRIGERATION
UPTI Affair
USAF Stability and Control DATCOM
UV completion
UV fixed point
Über die von der molekularkinetischen Theorie der Wärme geforderte Bewegung von in ruhenden Flüssigkeiten suspendierten Teilchen
Über quantentheoretische Umdeutung kinematischer und mechanischer Beziehungen
Udipi Ramachandra Rao
Ugo Fano
Ukichiro Nakaya
Ulf Leonhardt
Ultimate fate of the universe
Ultra-high-energy cosmic ray
Ultra-low frequency
Ultra high frequency
Ultrafast x-rays
Ultrahigh energy gamma-ray
Ultralight trike
Ultraluminous X-ray source
Ultramicroscope
Ultrarelativistic limit
Ultrashort pulse
Ultrasoft radiation
Ultrasonic flow meter
Ultrasonic foil (papermaking)
Ultrasonic force microscopy
Ultrasonic hearing
Ultrasonic horn
Ultrasonic nozzle
Ultrasonic sensor
Ultrasonic testing
Ultrasonic welding
Ultrasonics
Ultrasound
Ultrasound-enhanced systemic thrombolysis
Ultrasound attenuation spectroscopy
Ultraviolet
Ultraviolet catastrophe
Ultraviolet divergence
Umklapp scattering
Unbiennium
Uncertainty
Uncertainty principle
Unconventional wind turbines
Undercompressive shock wave
Understanding Physics
Undertow (wave action)
Underwater acoustic communication
Underwater acoustic positioning system
Underwater acoustics
Underwater telephone
Undulation of the geoid
Undulator
Undulatory theory of light
Unequal rotor lift distribution
Uniaxial crystal
Unified field theory
Uniform acceleration
Uniform circular motion
Uniform motion
Uniform theory of diffraction
Uniqueness theorem for Poisson's equation
Unit commensurability
Unit of length
Unitarity (physics)
Unitarity bound
Unitarity gauge
Unitary Plan Wind Tunnel
United States Air Force Stability and Control Digital DATCOM
United States Invitational Young Physicists Tournament
United States National Physics Olympiad
United States gravity control propulsion research
Units of measurement
Universal conductance fluctuations
Universal extra dimension
Universal force field
Universal linear accelerator
Universal quantum simulator
Universal wavefunction
Universality (dynamical systems)
Universe
Unparticle physics
Unrestricted Hartree–Fock
Unruh effect
Unruh temperature
Unsepttrium
Unsolved problems in astronomy
Untriseptium
Up quark
Upper-atmospheric lightning
Upper-convected Maxwell model
Upper-convected time derivative
Upper critical solution temperature
Upper hybrid oscillation
Upper tangent arc
Upsilon meson
Upward continuation
Upward looking sonar
Upwind scheme
Uranium
Uranium boride
Uranium carbide
Uranium dioxide
Uranium hydride bomb
Uranium in the environment
Uranium pentafluoride
Uranium tetrachloride
Uranium tetrafluoride
Uranyl carbonate
Uranyl nitrate
Uranyl peroxide
Urca process
Uriel Frisch
Ursell number
Ursula Franklin
Uspekhi Fizicheskikh Nauk
Ussing chamber
Uzi Landman

Indexes of physics articles